The Republican Memorial is a memorial in Crossmaglen, County Armagh, Northern Ireland. The memorial was unveiled in 1979 during The Troubles, as a dedication to the Provisional Irish Republican Army.

History 

During The Troubles, Crossmaglen and the South Armagh region were nicknamed "Bandit Country" by the British Army, due to the overwhelming support for the Provisional Irish Republican Army. The British Army established a base in the town, and in response, the Republican residents installed a Republican Memorial in the centre of the village, in Cardinal O'Fiaich Square.

The sculpture was designed by Yann Renard-Goulet (1914–1999), a native of Brittany. The pedestal features a phrase that is repeated in both English and Irish:

References 

Monuments and memorials in Northern Ireland
Outdoor sculptures in Ireland
Crossmaglen
1979 establishments in Northern Ireland
Sculptures of men in Ireland
Irish Republican Army memorials